The Monastery of San Xulián de Samos (Galician: Mosteiro de San Xulián de Samos; Spanish: Monasterio de San Julián de Samos) is an active Benedictine monastery in Samos, Galicia, Spain. It was founded in the sixth century.

The monastery was the School of Theology and Philosophy. It is also an important stop on the Way of Saint James, a pilgrimage leading to the shrine of the apostle Saint James the Great.

History
The foundation is attributed to Martin of Braga. It is known to have been renovated by Saint Fructuoso in the seventh century, although the first written mention of this event is from the year 665. An inscription on the walls of the cloister of the lodge says that it was rebuilt by the Bishop of Lugo Ermefredo. After this restoration it was abandoned before the Muslim invasion until the reconquest of King Fruela I of Asturias, which took place around 760. When, years later, he was assassinated, his widow and son, the future Alfonso II of Asturias, the Chaste, found refuge in the monastery. That earned the monastery royal protection, starting with the properties in a half-mile radius, which would encourage growth.

In the early tenth century, the bishop of Lugo, Don Ero, attempted to seize control and expelled the monks. The Counts Arias Menéndez and Gutierre Menéndez, children of Hermenegildo Menéndez, were required to repopulate the new monastery with monks. Thereafter there were good relations between the monastery and the Count's family.

In the same century it was reoccupied at the behest of King Ordoño II of León and from 960 the community lived under the rule of St. Benedict, but in the twelfth century the Cluniac reform joined with Bishop Don Juan. The monastery of Samos enjoyed great importance during the Middle Ages, which is reflected by its two hundred villas and five hundred sites. In 1558, already incorporated into the Royal San Benito of Valladolid, the monastery suffered a fire that forced its complete rebuilding. The community was dispossessed in 1836, with the confiscation of Mendizabal, but the Benedictine monks returned in 1880.

It suffered another fire in 1951, after which it had to be rebuilt again.

Description

There are several architectural styles: late Gothic, Renaissance and Baroque.

See also 

 Way of Saint James

References

External links
Abbey website

Benedictine monasteries in Spain
Monasteries in Galicia (Spain)
Bien de Interés Cultural landmarks in the Province of Lugo